FECOMZ is an acronym for "Forward Echelon, Communications Zone".  FECOMZ was a headquarters, organized in World War II and authorized by the Allied Supreme Commander, to organize and control Services of Supply for the invasion forces after D-Day.

ADSEC was a movable base section organized under FECOMZ.  FECOMZ reported to and was a separate command from the 12th Army Group that reported to directly SHAEF.  This unit would coordinate until D+90 (approximately).  Based on the D-Day date of June 6, 1944 this was about September 1944.

References

Sustainment and support units and formations of the United States Army